p53 is a tumor suppressor protein.

P53 may also refer to:

 p53 (band), an experimental music group
 p53 (album), their 1996 live album
 Curtiss XP-53, an American experimental fighter aircraft
 , a submarine of the Royal Navy
 , a patrol vessel of the Indian Navy
 P53 road (Ukraine)
 Papyrus 53, a biblical manuscript
 Pattern 1853 Enfield, a British rifle-musket
 P53, a state regional road in Latvia
 P53, a ThinkPad P series laptop